Monroe Township is a township in Juniata County, Pennsylvania, United States. The population was 2,048 at the 2020 census, a decrease from the figure of 2,237 tabulated in 2010.

Geography
The township is in northeastern Juniata County, with the West Branch of Mahantango Creek forming the northeastern boundary.

Monroe Township is bordered by Snyder County to the north and east, Susquehanna and Greenwood Townships to the south, and Delaware and Fayette Townships to the west. The unincorporated community of Richfield is at the northern border of the township. Other communities in the township are Evendale, Kellerville, Stony Run, and Knousetown.

Pennsylvania Route 35 passes through the northern part of the township, connecting Evendale and Richfield. The highway leads west to Mifflintown on the Juniata River and east to Selinsgrove on the Susquehanna.

Demographics

As of the census of 2000, there were 2,042 people, 712 households, and 571 families residing in the township.  The population density was 104.0 people per square mile (40.2/km).  There were 765 housing units at an average density of 39.0/sq mi (15.0/km).  The racial makeup of the township was 99.17% White, 0.34% African American, 0.05% Native American, 0.10% from other races, and 0.34% from two or more races. Hispanic or Latino of any race were 0.34% of the population.

There were 712 households, out of which 39.3% had children under the age of 18 living with them, 71.2% were married couples living together, 4.2% had a female householder with no husband present, and 19.7% were non-families. 16.3% of all households were made up of individuals, and 9.4% had someone living alone who was 65 years of age or older.  The average household size was 2.80 and the average family size was 3.13.

In the township the population was spread out, with 28.0% under the age of 18, 8.7% from 18 to 24, 29.0% from 25 to 44, 20.7% from 45 to 64, and 13.6% who were 65 years of age or older.  The median age was 34 years. For every 100 females, there were 104.4 males.  For every 100 females age 18 and over, there were 98.4 males.

The median income for a household in the township was $38,807, and the median income for a family was $41,731. Males had a median income of $30,064 versus $22,102 for females. The per capita income for the township was $16,477.  About 6.3% of families and 7.8% of the population were below the poverty line, including 8.0% of those under age 18 and 11.2% of those age 65 or over.

References

Populated places established in 1772
Townships in Juniata County, Pennsylvania
Townships in Pennsylvania